The 2022–23 CFR Cluj season is the club's 115th season in existence and the 19th consecutive season in the top flight of Romanian football. In addition to the domestic league, CFR Cluj are participating in this season's edition of the Cupa României, the Supercupa României, the UEFA Champions League and the UEFA Europa Conference League. The season covers the period from 1 July 2022 to 30 June 2023.

Players

First-team squad

Other players under contract

Out on loan

Pre-season and friendlies

Competitions

Overview

Liga I

League table

Results summary

Results by round

Matches 
The league fixtures were announced on 1 July 2022.

Cupa României

Group stage

Supercupa României

UEFA Champions League

First qualifying round

UEFA Europa Conference League

Second qualifying round

Third qualifying round

Play-off round

Group stage 

The draw for the group stage was held on 26 August 2022.

Knockout phase

Knockout round play-offs 
The draw for the knockout round play-offs was held on 7 November 2022.

References 

CFR Cluj seasons
CFR Cluj
CFR Cluj
CFR Cluj